Kevin Zschimmer (born 3 March 1993) is a German former professional footballer who plays as a right midfielder.

Career
Zschimmer signed for Hallescher FC in 2011, having been in Hamburger SV's youth team and made his 3. Liga debut in October 2012, as a substitute for Jan Beneš in a 2–0 defeat to Wacker Burghausen. He left Halle in July 2013, signing for VfR Neumünster.

References

External links

1993 births
Living people
German footballers
Footballers from Hamburg
Association football wingers
3. Liga players
Hallescher FC players
SC Victoria Hamburg players